Strindlund is a Swedish surname. Notable people with the surname include: 

Anna-Lena Strindlund (born 1971), Swedish actress
Gerhard Strindlund (1890–1957), Swedish politician
Marit Strindlund (born 1972), Swedish conductor
Pelle Strindlund (born 1971), Swedish writer and animal rights advocate

Swedish-language surnames